This is a list of semiconductor fabrication plants. A semiconductor fabrication plant is where integrated circuits (ICs), also known as microchips, are manufactured. They are either operated by Integrated Device Manufacturers (IDMs) who design and manufacture ICs in-house and may also manufacture designs from design-only  (fabless firms), or by pure play foundries who manufacture designs from fabless companies and do not design their own ICs. Some pure play foundries like TSMC offer IC design services, and others, like Samsung, design and manufacture ICs for customers, while also designing, manufacturing and selling their own ICs.

Glossary of terms
 Wafer size – largest wafer diameter that a facility is capable of processing. (Semiconductor wafers are circular.)
 Process technology node – size of the smallest features that the facility is capable of etching onto the wafers.
 Production capacity – a manufacturing facility's nameplate capacity. Generally max wafers produced per month.
 Utilization – the number of wafers that a manufacturing plant processes in relation to its production capacity.
 Technology/products – Type of product that the facility is capable of producing, as not all plants can produce all products on the market.

Open plants
Operating fabs include:

Number of open fabs currently listed here: 

(NOTE: Some fabs located in Asia don't use the number 4, or any 2 digit number that adds up to 4, because it is considered bad luck; see tetraphobia.)

Closed plants

Number of closed fabs currently listed here:

See also
 List of Intel manufacturing sites
 List of integrated circuit manufacturers
 Semiconductor device fabrication

References

Samsung capacity

External links
 서버 서버 호스팅 웹 호스팅 // IC Insights, Global Semiconductor Alliance, 2013-07-09
 Memory and Foundry Account For More Than Half of Worldwide IC Capacity // IC Insights, Global Semiconductor Alliance, 2013-07-09
SEMI World Fab Forecast 2013 // SEMI, 2013
Worldwide Location of Wafer Fabs – Interactive Map

Semiconductor device fabrication
Intel
Motorola
Texas Instruments
Semiconductor
Manufacturing plants